Benjamin Robert Jackson (born 22 October 1985) is an English footballer.

Football career

Jackson started his career with Doncaster Rovers in 2004. He joined York City on a month's loan in March 2005. This loan was extended until the end of the season in April 2005. Doncaster released him at the end of the 2004–05 season. Following a brief period with Bishop Auckland, Jackson was signed by Inverness Caledonian Thistle in February 2006, playing till the end of the season. He then returned to the Northern League, to sign for Horden Colliery Welfare.

Notes

External links

1985 births
Living people
Sportspeople from Durham, England
Footballers from County Durham
English footballers
Association football forwards
Doncaster Rovers F.C. players
York City F.C. players
Inverness Caledonian Thistle F.C. players
Darlington Town F.C. players
Bishop Auckland F.C. players